John Anthony Carlton Grant (born 9 August 1981) is a former English footballer who last played for Droylsden as a striker and previously played for a variety of other English football clubs.

Club career

Crewe Alexandra
Born in Manchester, Greater Manchester, Grant started his career at Crewe Alexandra who were at the time playing in the Division One. He said his brother Daniel Grant, a former schoolboy player at Manchester United, inspired him to play football so he signed in July 1999 and made his debut against Crystal Palace on the opening day of the 1999–2000 season. He was also a promising basketball player and trialed with Manchester Giants 
 
He was later loaned to Hyde United, and Northwich Victoria.

2002 to 2005
In the 2002 close season, Grant signed for Hereford United, before going on to join the now defunct Telford United in July 2003. In the summer of 2004, Grant then signed for Shrewsbury Town, who had just beaten Aldershot Town in the Conference play-off final.

Halifax Town
Grant was on the move again in March 2005, when he joined Halifax Town. Grant played and scored for Halifax Town in the 2006 Conference play-off final, at Leicester City's Walkers Stadium, against his former club Hereford United. Halifax Town lost the final. That season Grant finished as Halifax Town's top scorer with 14 goals. Despite being offered a new contract by Halifax Town, he decided to join Aldershot Town in the summer of 2006.

Aldershot Town
In July 2006, Grant signed for Aldershot Town. He scored twice on his debut against Gravesend & Northfleet, on the opening day of the 2006–07 season. At the end of the season, Grant was Aldershot Town's top scorer with 23 goals and he was voted the fans 'Player of the Year'.

In December 2007, Grant scored his first and only senior hat-trick against Salisbury City. In February 2008, he committed himself to the club until the end of the 2009–10 season. Grant ended the 2007–08 season as top-scorer with 25 goals, as Aldershot Town won the Conference National title and the Conference League Cup. He was also one of five Aldershot Town players that were named in the Conference Team of the Year.

Grant made his 100th appearance for Aldershot Town against Notts County in September 2008 and he scored his 50th goal for Aldershot Town against Rotherham United in November 2008. In February 2010, he joined Oxford United on loan until the end of the 2009–10 season.

Barrow
Grant was released by Aldershot at the end of the 2009–10 season. Subsequently, he joined Conference National club Barrow on 19 November 2010. He made his debut the following day as a substitute in a 1–1 draw with Grimsby Town. Grant left Barrow by mutual consent on 31 January 2011.

Macclesfield
On 5 August 2011 Grant signed for Macclesfield Town on a non-contract basis after training with the team during the pre-season. He made four appearances during the 2011–12 season, the last in a 0–2 home defeat to Southend United on 29 October 2011.

Droylsden
Having been without a club since his release from Macclesfield halfway through the 2011–12 season, Grant signed for struggling Conference North club Droylsden in March 2013, making his debut in a 4–0 defeat at Gloucester City on 12 March 2013. He made a further eight appearances during the 2012–13 season, failing to score.

England National Game XI
He also made his England National Game XI debut in May 2007 against the Republic of Ireland. Grant was in the squad that won that year's Four Nations Tournament and scored against Scotland on his full debut in the 3–0 victory on 25 May 2007.

Honours
Aldershot Town
Conference Premier: 2008
Conference League Cup: 2008

References

External links

1981 births
Living people
Footballers from Manchester
English footballers
England semi-pro international footballers
Association football forwards
Crewe Alexandra F.C. players
Northwich Victoria F.C. players
Hereford United F.C. players
Telford United F.C. players
Shrewsbury Town F.C. players
Halifax Town A.F.C. players
Aldershot Town F.C. players
Oxford United F.C. players
Barrow A.F.C. players
Macclesfield Town F.C. players
Droylsden F.C. players
National League (English football) players
English Football League players